Franklin Robert Adams (August 31, 1933 – January 4, 1990), who published as Robert Adams, was an American science fiction and fantasy writer. He is known best for his Horseclans books.

Writings 
Robert Adams is known primarily for his post-apocalyptic fiction. His first book, Coming of the Horseclans, published in 1975, was the first of his post-apocalyptic works, and began his Horseclans series. The series is notable for having a detailed world and labyrinthine timeline (many of his Horseclans books are so cross-referenced that they make sense only when read in sequential order). The Horseclans series became his best-known works.  While he never completed the series, he wrote 18 novels in the Horseclans series before his death.

From 1979 to 1989, Adams published several books as part of the series Castaways in Time. They used some elements of the "Horseclans" novels (phonetic accents and themes of civilization versus barbarism). While not as popular as the Horseclans series, it has a readership for its unique premises.

Beginning in 1985, Adams published several anthologies which he co-edited with a number of editors including Martin H. Greenberg, Pamela Crippen Adams, and Charles G. Waugh.

He later began publishing The Stairway to Forever book series in 1988, but only was able to complete two books of the series before his death.

Adams' style includes violent, almost non-stop action, and meticulous detail for matters both historical and military. As some of his series progressed he sometimes digressed, expounding conservative and especially libertarian opinions.

Adams died in Apopka, Florida on January 4, 1990.

Bibliography 
Source:

Horseclans 
 The Coming of the Horseclans (1975)
 Swords of the Horseclans (1976)
 Revenge of the Horseclans (1977)
 A Cat of Silvery Hue (1979)
 The Savage Mountains (1979)
 The Patrimony (1980)
 Horseclans Odyssey (1981)
 The Death of a Legend (1981)
 The Witch Goddess (1982)
 Bili the Axe (1982)
 Champion of the Last Battle (1983)
 A Woman of the Horseclans (1983)
 Horses of the North (1985)
 A Man Called Milo Morai (1986)
 The Memories of Milo Morai (1986)
 Trumpets of War (1987)
 Madman's Army (1987)
 The Clan of the Cats (1988)

Castaways in Time 
 Castaways in Time (1980)
 The Seven Magical Jewels of Ireland (1984)
 Of Quests and Kings (1986)
 Of Chiefs and Champions (1987)
 Of Myths and Monsters (1988)
 Of Beginnings and Endings (1989)

Stairway to Forever 
 The Stairway to Forever (1988)
 Monsters and Magicians (1988)
 Guideposts to Danger (planned title, never written)

Anthologies edited

Magic in Ithkar (with Andre Norton) 
 Magic in Ithkar (1985)
 Magic in Ithkar 2 (1985)
 Magic in Ithkar 3 (1987)
 Magic in Ithkar 4 (1987)

Other 
 Barbarians (1986), ed. (with Martin H. Greenberg and Charles G. Waugh)
 Barbarians II (1987), ed. (with Pamela Crippen-Adams and Martin H. Greenberg)
 Friends of the Horseclans (1987), ed. (with Pamela Crippen-Adams)
 Friends of the Horseclans II (1989), ed. (with Pamela Crippen-Adams)
 Robert Adams' Book of Alternate Worlds (1987), ed. (with Pamela Crippen-Adams and Martin H. Greenberg)
 Hunger for Horror (1988), ed. (with Pamela Crippen-Adams and Martin H. Greenberg)
 Robert Adams' Book of Soldiers (1988) (with Pamela Crippen-Adams and Martin H. Greenberg)
 Alternatives (1989) (with Pamela Crippen-Adams)
 Phantom Regiments (1990), ed. (with Pamela Crippen-Adams and Martin H. Greenberg)

Citations

General sources 
 New General Catalog of Old Books and Authors

Further reading
Archival resources
 The Robert Adams Papers (14 linear feet) are held by the Special Collections & Archives Department of the University of California, Riverside Libraries.

External links 
 
 Bibliography

1933 births
1990 deaths
20th-century American novelists
20th-century American male writers
American fantasy writers
American male novelists
American science fiction writers
American libertarians